Eyewitness is an album by the Dutch progressive rock band Kayak. The original LP was released in 1981. The album was recorded 'live' (but without audience) in a recording studio, with some overdubs added later. To create a 'live' atmosphere, Kayak fans were invited later to cheer and clap to the already recorded songs. The CD release was transferred from the original tapes, so it doesn't have the audience participation. The album has three new songs: Eyewitness, Who's Fooling Who and Only You And I Know.

The line-up of the band didn't feature background singers Irene Linders and Katherine Lapthorne anymore. After this album, the band broke up, only to reincarnate in 1999.

Track listing 

 "Eyewitness" (T. Scherpenzeel/I. Linders) - 3:21
 "Periscope Life" (T. Scherpenzeel) - 4:09
 "Ruthless Queen" (T. Scherpenzeel/I. Linders) - 5:05
 "Want You To Be Mine" (T. Scherpenzeel) - 4:48
 "Lyrics" (T. Scherpenzeel) - 1:59
 "Chance For A Lifetime" (T. Scherpenzeel) - 4:22
 "Who's Fooling Who" (T. Scherpenzeel/I. Linders) - 3:44
 "Irene" (T. Scherpenzeel) - 3:12
 "Only You And I Know" (T. Scherpenzeel/I. Linders) - 3:12
 "Winning Ways" (T. Scherpenzeel/I. Linders) - 3:28
 "Starlight Dancer" (T. Scherpenzeel) - 4:58
 "No Man's Land" (T. Scherpenzeel) - 5:22

Bonus tracks (1994 reissue)

 "The Car Enchanter (Sikkens Song)" (T. Scherpenzeel/I. Linders) - 2:36
 "Ivory Dance '94" (T. Scherpenzeel) - 2:51

Lineup
 Edward Reekers - lead vocals (all but 5)
 Johan Slager - guitars, backing vocals
 Ton Scherpenzeel - keyboards, backing vocals
 Peter Scherpenzeel - bass guitar
 Max Werner - drums, backing and lead (5) vocals

External links
Official website

Kayak (band) live albums
1981 live albums